House of Secrets is the second studio album by the American heavy metal band Otep, produced by Greg Wells (Deftones, Rufus Wainwright, Mika), and released in 2004. The album entered the Billboard 200 at number 93. The video for the song "Warhead" made the top ten videos of 2004 on MTV's Headbangers Ball. This album has been released with the Copy Control protection system in some regions.

Music and lyrics
The album features elements of several musical genres including spoken word, hip hop, doom metal and speed metal. The album is noted for having lyrical topics about insecurity and self-loathing. However, the song "Warhead" has extremely political lyrics.

Critical reception

Billboard called the album "terrifying" and that it brimmed "with sounds that can warp the psyche." Jill Mikkelson for Exclaim! was more critical of the album, calling the lyrics "way too dramatic and adolescent to stimulate anything but scorn" and said of the overall album being a "little more than another Ozzfest headliner."

Track listing

Personnel
 Otep Shamaya – vocals, bass drum, didgeridoo, cymbal scrapes (11)
 Rob Patterson – guitar (2, 3, 10)
 Greg Wells – metal strips (1), steel drums (1), guitar (4-6, 8-12), celeste (5), drums (5, 8, 9), percussion (10), piano (12)
 Jason "eViL J" McGuire – bass guitar, back up vocals (3), guitar (4, 5)
 Joey Jordison (Slipknot) – drums (2, 3, 4, 6, 10, 11)

Production
 Producer: Greg Wells
 Executive producer: Otep Shamaya
 Engineers: Brian Scheuble, Greg Wells
 Assistant engineers: Dan Beeston, Monique Mizrahi
 Mixing: Greg Wells
 Mastering: Roger Lian, Howie Weinberg
 A&R: Ron Laffitte
 Art direction: P.R. Brown
 Design: P.R. Brown
 Photography: P.R. Brown

Charts
Album - Billboard (North America)

References

Otep albums
Capitol Records albums
2004 albums
Albums produced by Greg Wells